Brucefield may refer to:
 Brucefield, South Australia, a locality east of Tickera in Australia
 Brucefield, Fife, near Dunfermline in Scotland
 Brucefield, Ontario, a community in Bluewater in Canada